Gregory Homeming O.C.D. (born 30 May 1958) is the Bishop of the Roman Catholic Diocese of Lismore. His installation took place on 22 February 2017.

Homeming was born on 30 May 1958 into a Chinese Australian family and was educated in Shepparton, Victoria, before completing his secondary education at St Aloysius' College in Milsons Point. He joined the Discalced Carmelite order in 1985 after working for four years as a lawyer, and was ordained a Carmelite priest on 20 July 1991 after having obtained a Bachelor of Theology from the Melbourne College of Divinity and a Master of Philosophy from the University of Melbourne. Until his episcopal consecration, he served as the regional vicar of the Discalced Carmelite friars in Sydney.

Notes

External links
Father Gregory Homeming, O.C.D.

1958 births
Living people
Australian people of Chinese descent
University of Melbourne alumni
21st-century Roman Catholic bishops in Australia
Discalced Carmelite bishops
Roman Catholic bishops of Lismore
University of Divinity alumni